was a Japanese actress. She appeared in more than 140 films between 1935 and 1985. Her brothers were the actors Daisuke Katō and Kunitarō Sawamura. Her autobiography, My Asakusa, has been translated into English.
Sawamura married fellow Japanese actor Kamatari Fujiwara (known in the West for his role as Manzō (万造) in the Seven Samurai) in 1936. They divorced 10 years later.

Selected filmography

Film
 Totsugu hi made (1940)
 The Life of Oharu (1952)
 Epitome (1953)
 So Young, So Bright (1955)
 Street of Shame (1956)
 Late Autumn (1960)
 The Wandering Princess (1960)
 Zero Focus (1961)
 Chūshingura: Hana no Maki, Yuki no Maki (1962)

Television
 Shinsho Taikōki (1973), Ōmandokoro
 Sekigahara (1981), Maeda Matsu

References

External links

 

1908 births
1996 deaths
Japanese film actresses
Actresses from Tokyo
20th-century Japanese actresses